Campanula lactiflora, the milky bellflower, is a species of flowering plant in the genus Campanula of the family Campanulaceae, native to Turkey and the Caucasus. Large conical clusters of open, star-shaped flowers are produced on branching stems in summer. In favourable conditions it will self-seed with variable results. The flowers are usually white or pale blue, but numerous cultivars have been developed for garden use, in a range of colours.

The Latin specific epithet lactiflora means "milk-white flowers".

The following cultivars have gained the Royal Horticultural Society's Award of Garden Merit:-
'Alba' (white)
'Favourite' (lilac)
'Loddon Anna' (pale pink)
'Prichard's Variety' (violet blue)

References

lactiflora